Jean-Pierre "Jhemp" Bertrand (1921 – 1 July 2008) was a politician and activist in Luxembourg.  He was a councillor in Schuttrange for 43 years, and was a perennial candidate.

A tax collector by profession, Bertrand became a tax resister.  Bertrand started politics as a member of the Democratic Party, before founding a number of parties to advance his politics, including the Liberal Party (1979), the Republican Party (1989), the Party for Regional and Real Politics (1994), and The Taxpayer (1999).

Footnotes

Democratic Party (Luxembourg) politicians
Luxembourgian libertarians
Tax resisters
1921 births
2008 deaths